There are 15 military bands of the Bundeswehr, including those of the German Army, Air Force, Navy, and joint bands. Before 2009, the military musicians of the Bundeswehr constituted a joint specialist service, the Military Music Service, subordinate to the Armed Forces Office. In 2009, as part of a larger reorganisation of the Bundeswehr, the organization of the Military Music Service was replaced by the new Military Music Center of the Bundeswehr in Bonn, and several bands were disbanded. The bands of the Bundeswehr provide music for official ceremonies such as the Großer Zapfenstreich and the swearing-in of new recruits. In addition to their traditional military music repertoire, they perform concert band and light music, as well as genres such as jazz, rock, and pop.

Structure 

The professional management of all the military bands of the Bundeswehr lies with the director of the Military Music Center of the Bundeswehr. Since 2016, Colonel Christoph Lieder has held this position. The individual bands may be subject to military divisions or regional commands as well.

Joint bands 
There are four joint service bands in the Bundeswehr that are part of the Armed Forces Office, a component of the Joint Support Service. There also are two bands associated with military districts, which used to be Army bands. Although these bands primarily use German Army uniforms, they are not officially subordinate to the Army.

Army 

In addition to the professional Army bands, there are several amateur marching bands made up of reservists.

Air Force

Navy

History 

While the formation of the Bundeswehr was being prepared in the 1950s, then-Chancellor Konrad Adenauer is said to have placed great importance on the formation of military bands. He demanded at least one band be formed during the Bundeswehr's first year of existence; and, indeed, six bands were formed. The first band of the Bundeswehr was established on 2 January 1956, Musikkorps III A in Andernach (later Army Band 7). The bands of the Bundewehr have gone through many phases of reduction, growth and change since then. For some time each Army division had its own band (some of these bands, like the Gebirgsmusikkorps, survive today in some form), and the Navy and Air Force have had more than their current two bands for most of their history. These serve as the link of the armed forces to the long years of the German military music tradition.

As a general rule the Armeemarschsammlung forms part of the band repertory music, which include ceremonial marches for parades.

Personnel 

The enlisted personnel of Bundeswehr bands are drawn from those who initially volunteer for two years of service in the Bundeswehr (and formerly conscripts). Unteroffiziere (junior NCOs) used to be allowed to enlist for a minimum of four years. Feldwebel (senior NCOs) enlist for a minimum of twelve years of service, including a four-year undergraduate degree in music at the Robert Schumann Hochschule. Commissioned officers earn a Diplom degree as Kapellmeisters and commit to a minimum of fifteen years of service. Senior NCOs and commissioned officers go through their advanced training as members of the Training Band of the Bundeswehr.

In the case of war, military musicians will serve in the Joint Medical Service. In addition to musical training, every musician receives some form of medical training, including study at the Medical Academy of the Bundeswehr for senior personnel.

References

External links 

  Official website
 German Federal Defence Forces Massed Bands

German military bands
Bundeswehr